Duane Sommers (November 15, 1932 – August 26, 2015) was an American politician who served in the Washington House of Representatives from the 6th district from 1987 to 1993 and from 1995 to 2001.

He died on August 26, 2015, in Spokane, Washington at age 82.

References

1932 births
2015 deaths
Republican Party members of the Washington House of Representatives